Mirror of Souls is the second album by Christian progressive/power metal band Theocracy. It was released by Ulterium Records on November 21, 2008 in Europe, November 26 in Japan, and December 9 in North America. It is Theocracy's first album as a full band, as their self-titled debut album was a one-man project by current lead vocalist Matt Smith. In Finland it was album of the week at Imperiumi.net website which called the album "clearly one of the best melodic power metal albums of the year". In 2010, HM Magazine ranked it #16 on the Top 100 Christian metal albums of all time list.

Artwork
The cover of the album was made by Robert G. Wilson, Jr. Theocracy have also made an appearance on the cover of the January/December 2007 issue of Heaven's Metal magazine.

Track listing

Credits 

 Matt Smith - lead vocals, guitar, bass, keyboards
 Jonathan Hinds - guitar, backing vocals
 Shawn Benson - drums, backing vocals

References

External links
 Review at NewReleaseTuesday.com

Theocracy (band) albums
2008 albums